Qaqqannalik (Inuktitut syllabics: ᖃᖅᑲᓐᓇᓕᒃ) formerly Forder Island is an uninhabited island located in the Qikiqtaaluk Region, Nunavut, Canada. It is a Baffin Island offshore island in Hudson Strait, and a member of the Sheer Islands, along with Lee Island, Lavoie Island, and Wishart Island.

References

Islands of Baffin Island
Islands of Hudson Strait
Uninhabited islands of Qikiqtaaluk Region